Anthracite Bank Building, also known as The Beard Building, is a historic former bank building located at Tamaqua, Schuylkill County, Pennsylvania.  It was built in 1850, and is a three-story, three bay wide, brick building in the Italianate style. The first floor exterior is white marble.  It housed Tamaqua's first financial institution until 1865. It later served as home of Civil War hero Col. Henry L. Cake and wife Eliza. Cake commanded the 96th PA Volunteer Infantry, rose to the rank of brigadier general, and later served as a member of the fortieth and forty-first U.S. Congress. For several years beginning in 2002, the building served as the Anthracite Inn Bed & Breakfast operated by owner Donald Serfass.

It was added to the National Register of Historic Places in 1978.

References

Bank buildings on the National Register of Historic Places in Pennsylvania
Italianate architecture in Pennsylvania
Commercial buildings completed in 1850
Buildings and structures in Schuylkill County, Pennsylvania
National Register of Historic Places in Schuylkill County, Pennsylvania